The İzmirim Kart is a proximity type smart card used for payment in public transport of İzmir, Turkey. It gradually replaced İzmir Kentkart after Kentkart could not get the tender. Disposable variant is called bilet 35 and it is possible to buy 3, 5, 10 credit forms.

Refills
The pay-as-you-go variant of the card operates as if it were stored-value, though it is technically a deposit card. Refills are done by electronic funds transfer via VakıfBank using deposit accounts associated to supported POS terminals.

Security
The card stores data about last few transactions to prevent fraud. Transactions otherwise commence online. If data on the card about a particular transaction mismatches data on the central database, the card may be blocked.

References

Fare collection systems in Turkey
Transport in İzmir
Contactless smart cards
2015 establishments in Turkey
Rapid transit in Turkey
Ferry transport in Turkey
Public transport in Turkey